Pyrgulopsis deserta is a species of freshwater snail in the family Hydrobiidae, the mud snails. It is known by the common names desert springsnail, Virgin springsnail, and St. George snail. It occurs in southwestern Utah and northwestern Arizona in the United States.

Original description 
Pyrgulopsis deserta was originally described as Amnicola deserta by Henry Augustus Pilsbry in 1916.

Pilsbry's original text (the type description) reads as follows:

References 
This article incorporates a public domain text from reference.

External links 
NatureServe. 2014. Pyrgulopsis deserta. NatureServe Explorer. Version 7.1. Accessed September 11, 2014.

deserta
Molluscs of the United States
Gastropods described in 1916